George James Horatio Jeffs , commonly known as Jimmy Jeffs (27 January 1900 - 14 May 1996) was a civilian air traffic control officer at Croydon. In 1922 he was issued Air Traffic Control Licence No. 1. He is credited with developing several early procedures for preventing aircraft collisions.

References

Further reading

External links

 

Croydon Airport
1900 births
Air traffic controllers
1996 deaths